Sam Flanders (born 24 July 2001) is a professional Australian rules footballer who plays for the Gold Coast Football Club in the Australian Football League (AFL).

Early life
Flanders was born in Fish Creek, Victoria. He grew up playing basketball and Australian rules football at high junior levels.

AFL career
Flanders was drafted by the Gold Coast Suns with the eleventh pick in the 2019 AFL draft. He made his AFL debut in round 11 of the 2020 AFL season against Essendon at Metricon Stadium.

Statistics
 Statistics are correct to the end of 2022

|-
|- 
! scope="row" style="text-align:center" | 2020
|style="text-align:center;"|
| 26 || 5 || 2 || 1 || 17 || 14 || 31 || 4 || 14 || 0.4 || 0.2 || 3.4 || 2.8 || 6.2 || 0.8 || 2.8
|- style="background-color: #EAEAEA"
! scope="row" style="text-align:center" | 2021
|style="text-align:center;"|
| 26 || 16 || 4 || 5 || 96 || 93 || 189 || 46 ||62 || 0.3 || 0.3 || 6.0 || 5.8 || 11.8 || 2.9 || 3.9
|- 
! scope="row" style="text-align:center" | 2022
|style="text-align:center;"|
| 26 || 9 || 3 || 1 || 51 || 46 || 97 || 22 || 19 || 0.3 || 0.1 || 5.6 || 5.1 || 10.8 || 2.4 || 2.1
|-
|- class="sortbottom"
! colspan=3| Career
! 30
! 9
! 7
! 166
! 153
! 319
! 72
! 98
! 0.3
! 0.2
! 5.5
! 5.1
! 10.6
! 2.4
! 3.3
|}

Notes

References

External links

2001 births
Living people
Australian rules footballers from Victoria (Australia)
Gold Coast Football Club players
Gippsland Power players